Izitso is the tenth studio album released by the British singer-songwriter Cat Stevens in April 1977. After the lacklustre Numbers, the album proved to be his comeback. The album updated the rhythmic folk rock and pop rock style of his earlier albums with the extensive use of synthesizers and other electronic music instruments, giving the album a more electronic rock and synthpop style, and anticipating elements of electro.

Overview

Upon its release, the music magazine Rolling Stone praised the album for blending together elements of folk rock and electronic music, "often in apparent opposition to each other", with "the diversity and the maturity to match this seeming incongruity." The album reached No. 7 on the American Pop Albums charts.

It also included his last US and UK top 40 chart hit for almost three decades,  the Days of the) Old Schoolyard", an early synthpop song that used the Polymoog, an early polyphonic synthesizer; it was a duet with fellow UK singer Elkie Brooks. Linda Lewis appears in the song's video, with Cat Stevens singing to her, as they portray former schoolmates, singing to each other on a schoolyard merry-go-round. (This is one of the few music videos that Stevens made, other than simple videos of concert performances.)

The song "Child for a Day" was featured in the 1977 film First Love, starring Susan Dey and William Katt.

The song "Was Dog a Doughnut?" upon release was criticised for sounding "a bit too robotlike" but has since been considered one of the first electro, or techno-pop, songs ever recorded, with elements later associated with hip hop music. The track made early use of a music sequencer along with synthesizers.  In an interview for Uncut in 2014, Yusuf (Stevens) explains his inspiration for the song:

The song "(I Never Wanted) To Be a Star" references the transition phase happening in his life, as he was growing more and more resentful of the more commercial aspects of the music industry. The lyrics make references to four of his early songs: "Matthew and Son", "I'm Gonna Get Me a Gun", "A Bad Night", and "I Think I See the Light".

Additional information
Some of the album's unreleased tracks featured Ringo Starr on the drums, during a recording session on 30 September 1976. According to The Beatles biographer Kristofer Engelhardt in 1998, "Yusuf said that he met Ringo at a hotel in Copenhagen, Denmark, and invited him down to a recording session for his album Izitso at Sweet Silence Studios in Copenhagen. He recalled that the party atmosphere of the sessions led to a jam of him singing 'Blue Monday' and 'I Just Want to Make Love to You,' with Ringo joining in on drums." Bootleg copies of the sessions exist.

Stevens, who had a strong interest in Islam prior to recording the album, formally converted to Islam later in the year and adopted the name Yusuf Islam in 1978, by which time the album Back to Earth would be released and Islam had essentially retired from the music business. It would be nearly 30 years before he would again perform Cat Stevens songs.

A piano/vocal sheet music book with every song from the album was published in 1977, approved by Stevens, with arrangements by Los Angeles musician Laddie Chapman.

Track listing
All tracks composed by Cat Stevens, except where indicated

Side one
 "(Remember the Days of the) Old Schoolyard" – 2:44 (duet with Elkie Brooks)
 "Life" – 4:56
 "Killin' Time" – 3:30
 "Kypros" [instrumental] – 3:10
 "Bonfire" – 4:10

Side two
 "(I Never Wanted) To Be a Star" – 3:03
 "Crazy" – 3:33
 "Sweet Jamaica" – 3:31
 "Was Dog a Doughnut?" [instrumental] (Stevens, Bruce Lynch, Jean Roussel) – 4:15
 "Child for a Day" (Paul Travis, David Gordon) – 4:23

Personnel
 Cat Stevens – vocals, Epiphone Casino electric guitar, Ovation guitar, electric guitar, acoustic guitar, steel guitar, guitar synthesizer, bouzouki, piano, celesta, harpsichord, Wurlitzer electric piano, Fender Rhodes, Polymoog, Moog synthesizer, Minimoog, ARP String Synthesizer, ARP 2600, Yamaha CS-80, Yamaha GX-1, Yamaha EA5R electronic organ, music sequencer, drums, percussion, harmonica, brass arrangements
 Jean Roussel – Hammond organ, piano, organ, synthesizer, ARP String Synthesizer, Yamaha CS-80, glockenspiel, vibraphone, string and brass arrangements
 David Campbell – string and brass arrangements
 Chick Corea – electric piano on "Bonfire" and "Was Dog a Doughnut?"
 Barry Beckett – organ on "Killin' Time", piano and electric piano and "Child for a Day"
 Tim Henson – piano on "Killin' Time", organ on "Child for a Day"
 Broderick Smith – harmonica on "Sweet Jamaica"
 Marjorie Lagerwall – harp on "Sweet Jamaica"
 Ray Gomez – electric guitar on "Was Dog a Doughnut?"
 Pete Carr – electric guitar on "Killin' Time" and "Child for a Day"
 Jim Johnson – rhythm guitar on "Killin' Time"
 Weldon Myrick – steel guitar on "(I Never Wanted) to Be a Star"
 Reggie Young – electric guitar on "(I Never Wanted) to Be a Star"
 Bruce Lynch – bass guitar, music sequencer on "Was Dog a Doughnut?"
 David Hood – bass guitar on "Killin' Time" and "Child for a Day"
 Andy Newmark – drums and percussion on "(Remember the Days of the) Old Schoolyard" and "Kypros" and "Bonfire" and "Sweet Jamaica"
 Bill Berg – drums and percussion on "Life" and "(I Never Wanted) to Be a Star" and "Crazy"
 Barry Morgan – additional drums on "Life"
 Roger Hawkins – drums and percussion on "Killin' Time" and "Child for a Day"
 Elkie Brooks – vocals on "(Remember the Days of the) Old Schoolyard"
 Suzanne Lynch – backing vocals on "(Remember the Days of the) Old Schoolyard" and "Life" and "Sweet Jamaica"
 Carla Benson – backing vocals on "Sweet Jamaica"
 Evette Benton – backing vocals on "Sweet Jamaica"
 Barbara Ingram – backing vocals on "Sweet Jamaica"
 Gene Page – string and brass arrangements

Production
 Producers – Cat Stevens, Dave Kershenbaum
 Engineers – Harvey Goldberg, Mike Stavros, Ian Boughey, Nigel Walker, Flemming Rasmussen, Tom Jung, Paul Martinson, Nick Blagona, Mike Ross, Freddy Hansson, Steve Brandon, Jerry Masters, Gene Eichelberger, Dee Robb, John Kelly, Ken Frieson
 Mastering – Ted Jensen, Bernie Grundman
 Mixing – Claude Dupras
 Design – Mathieu Bitton
 Programming – Cat Stevens, Claude Dupras
 Supervisor – Bill Levenson
 Illustrations – Cat Stevens
 Cover Designs – Cat Stevens, Eckford Stimpson
 Photography – Moshe Brakha
 Coordinator – Beth Stempel

Charts

Weekly charts

Year-end charts

Singles

Cat Stevens duet with Elkie Brooks,  "Remember the Days of the Old Schoolyard", but Linda Lewis appears in the song's video. In Canada, the additional singles "Sweet Jamaica" and "Was Dog A Doughnut" reached numbers 98 and 79 respectively.

Certifications and sales

References

1977 albums
A&M Records albums
Albums arranged by David Campbell (composer)
Albums arranged by Gene Page
Albums produced by David Kershenbaum
Albums recorded at Muscle Shoals Sound Studio
Cat Stevens albums
Island Records albums